Pencran is a commune in the Finistère department of Brittany in north-western France.

Geography

Climate
Pencran has a oceanic climate (Köppen climate classification Cfb).

Population
Inhabitants of Pencran are called in French Pencranais.

Notable Pencranais

Paul Le Guen, former football player and former Rangers F.C manager

See also
Communes of the Finistère department
Pencran Parish close

References

External links

Official website 

Mayors of Finistère Association 

Communes of Finistère